Vandervoort may refer to:

Places
Vandervoort, Arkansas, United States

People
Benjamin H. Vandervoort (1917–1990), an American soldier
Laura Vandervoort, a Canadian actress
Paul Vandervoort (1846-1902), American soldier who served in the Union Army

See also
Van der Voort, surname